Wake Forest Department of Theatre and Dance is a department within Wake Forest University which instructs students in theatre and dance and puts on four productions each school season and maintains the university's theatre. The department is based at the Scales Fine Arts Center on campus. The department cooperates with other branches of the university to focus to contemporary topics in the media by sponsoring films and other activities, lectures and workshops, charitable events and guest performers. In 2011, the department had eleven full-time theatre faculty and five full-time dance faculty.

University theatre
The university theatre has been offering plays and musicals since 1942. In the first decade of the twenty-first century, there have been four main productions during each annual school season, and feature musicals, comedies, drama and tragedies. The theatre is led by John E. R. Friedenberg, a senior lecturer and Associate Professor (Emeritus) who has taught at Wake Forest since 1988 and who serves on the boards of several theatre and arts organizations. Friedenberg and several other directors take turns working on different productions, and typically direct one production each academic year. The program makes use of the MainStage theatre in the Scales Center as well as the Ring Theatre. In addition, the theatre is the venue for other types of productions, such as one-person performances.

Many productions combine skills from theatre and dance professors and tackle sometimes unusual projects. For example, the production Sonnets for an Old Century featured "newly dead" persons in an airy space who were encouraged by the "experienced dead" to make a statement to the world, and to relate stories of their lives. In the Wake Forest production of Smash, a socialist millionaire infiltrates an upper-class school for girls to try to plant the seed of socialism into their young minds since they may become "future cabinet ministers", but the comedy erupts into love triangles, mistaken identities, and light-hearted look at Karl Marx and Friedrich Engels. The play Three Penny Opera was first performed in Germany in 1928, and it needed minor adjustments to make it work for modern audiences, such as modeling the character Peachum on Bernie Madoff:

Theatre productions have won positive reviews. Sonnets for an Old Century won plaudits for having a "strong ensemble performances". Friedenberg's production of Three Penny Opera kept the audience "fully engaged" including "more-than-risqué costumes" and excellent music, according to one report. The production of John Steinbeck's The Grapes of Wrath in 2011 was praised for its "stagecraft" and was described as an "ambitious and admirable" take on "challenging material." The production of Eurydice was described as a "crazy salad of ideas about music, words, living in the present and remembering the past." Directing, according to Friedenberg, is not about multitasking but rather having the "experience and context to be able to figure out which tree needs attention when you look at the forest." It is a process of breaking down complex productions into smaller steps and approaching them in the right order. He added "I think the most important part of the learning curve is to trust yourself, to know your team and how they work, and to know when to push and when to wait." In 2011, Friedenberg recruited playwright John Cariani and star of the TV show Law & Order to work with Wake Forest theater students during their dress rehearsal phase of Cariani's play Almost, Maine.

Programs of instruction

Theatre
Students who choose to major in theatre are required to take a minimum of 33 course-hours in subjects such as acting, voice and movement, design and production, directing, scene design, and history of western theatre. Majors are typically declared by students during the spring of their sophomore year, but they are urged to do so sooner if inclined. Students must take two courses in dramatic literature. Students who choose to minor in theatre are required to take 18 course-hours. Students must have a 2.0 grade point average to graduate. The department is located in the Scales Fine Arts Center. Students have gone on to careers in acting and directing. According to director J. E. R. Friedenberg, the program can teach techniques, tools, processes, and provide opportunities to practice the craft of acting and directing in an environment with constructive feedback.

Dance
Dance is offered as an academic minor subject. Courses include dance composition, ballet, tap dancing, jazz dancing, history of dance, improvisation, and social dance. Experienced dancers can try out for the Wake Forest Dance Company.

Student groups
Student groups involved with acting include the Anthony Aston Players which does a number of projects during the school year including campus wide service and charitable events such as Project Pumpkin and Hit the Bricks and presents readings with its Rep Hour program, and produces one-act and full-length plays. Other groups include a student comedy troupe known as the Lilting Banshees, a Christian theatre troupe called the Living Parables, and a multicultural theatre ensemble known as Umoja. Student dance groups include Gotta Dance and Taylor Academy of dance.

Productions

Source: University Theatre Production Archives

Notable alumni
 Michael Baron, Artistic Director at Lyric Theatre of Oklahoma in Oklahoma City.
 Curt Beech, art director for 2009 film Star Trek
 Allyson Currin, playwright
 Cary Donaldson, actor, appeared in Merchant of Venice with Al Pacino.
 Drew Droege, actor, appeared in various films, television shows, and the Chloe web series
 Marc Palmieri, playwright, actor, screenwriter (graduated 1994)
 Kate Roberts, actress, appeared in Broadway show of Bloody Bloody Andrew Jackson

References

External links
 Department of Theatre and Dance website at Wake Forest

Drama schools in the United States
Educational institutions established in 1942
Dance in North Carolina
Theatre in North Carolina
1942 establishments in North Carolina